The following is a list of notable deaths in February 2014.

Entries for each day are listed alphabetically by surname. A typical entry lists information in the following sequence:
Name, age, country of citizenship and reason for notability, established cause of death, reference.

February 2014

1
Floyd Adams, Jr., 68, American politician, Mayor of Savannah, Georgia (1996–2003).
Antone S. Aguiar, Jr., 84, American judge and politician, member of the Massachusetts House of Representatives (1965–1982).
Orlanda Amarílis, 89, Cape Verdean author.
Luis Aragonés, 75, Spanish football player and manager.
Prospero Nale Arellano, 77, Filipino Roman Catholic prelate, Prelate of Libmanan (1989–2008).
Marie-Thérèse Assiga Ahanda, 72, Cameroonian novelist, chemist, and paramount chief.
Elisabetta Barbato, 92, Italian opera singer.
Stefan Bozhkov, 90, Bulgarian football player and manager.
John J. Cali, 95, American real estate developer.
Gunnar Hallkvist, 95, Swedish Olympic speed skater (1952).
Tony Hateley, 72, English footballer (Notts County).
Herbert Lundström, 88, Finnish Olympic bandy player (1952).
Ronald McLelland, 87, Canadian politician.
Vasily Petrov, 97, Russian military officer, Marshal of the Soviet Union.
Meine Pit, 82, Dutch politician, Senator (1987–1991, 1993–1999).
Dave Power, 85, Australian Olympic bronze-medalist athlete (1960).
Rene Ricard, 67, American poet, painter and art critic, cancer.
Luis Salvadores Salvi, 81, Chilean basketball player.
Maximilian Schell, 83, Austrian-Swiss actor (Judgment at Nuremberg, Julia, Deep Impact), Oscar winner (1962), pneumonia.
Tajul Ulama, 94, Indian Sunni Muslim scholar.
Henri Wassenbergh, 89, Dutch academic.
Gordon Zacks, 80, American businessman and presidential advisor, prostate cancer.

2
Gerd Albrecht, 78, German conductor, chief conductor of the Czech Philharmonic (1993–1996).
Frank Allen, 86, English footballer.
Leonora Amar, 87, Brazilian actress.
Tommy Aquino, 21, American motorcycle racer, training collision.
Karl Erik Bøhn, 48, Norwegian teacher, team handball player and coach, leukemia.
Keith Bradshaw, 74, Welsh rugby union player.
Nicholas Brooks, 73, English medieval historian.
Bunny Rugs, 65, Jamaican reggae musician (Third World), leukemia.
Benny Carter, 70, American contemporary visual artist.
Eduardo Coutinho, 80, Brazilian film director, stabbed.
Cecil Franks, 78, British politician, MP for Barrow and Furness (1983–1992).
Philip Seymour Hoffman, 46, American actor (Capote, Magnolia, Doubt), Oscar winner (2006), acute mixed drug intoxication.
Werner Husemann, 94, German Luftwaffe night fighter pilot, recipient of the Knight's Cross of the Iron Cross (1944).
Craig Lahiff, 66, Australian film director (Heaven's Burning, Ebbtide, Black and White).
J. D. 'Okhai Ojeikere, 83, Nigerian photographer.
Jiří Palko, 72, Czech Olympic rower.
Sibusiso Papa, 26, South African footballer, traffic collision.
Michel Pastor, 70, Monacan business executive, Chairman of AS Monaco FC (2004–2008), cancer.
Luis Raúl, 51, American Puerto Rican actor and comedian, bilateral pneumonia.
Yves Ryan, 85, Canadian politician, Mayor of Montreal North (1963–2001), heart disease.
Alfredo Sinclair, 98, Panamanian artist, heart failure.
Eric O. Stork, 87, American civil servant (E.P.A.).
Al Vandeweghe, 93, American football player (Buffalo Bisons).
Nigel Walker, 54, English footballer (Newcastle United), cancer.
Cliff Williams, 74, Welsh rugby player.

3
Rosendo Álvarez Gastón, 87, Spanish Roman Catholic prelate, Bishop of Jaca (1984–1989) and Almería (1989–2002).
Louise Brough, 90, American Hall of Fame tennis player, ranked No. 1 (1955).
Richard Bull, 89, American actor (Little House on the Prairie, High Plains Drifter, Voyage to the Bottom of the Sea).
Isaac de Vega, 93, Spanish Canarian writer.
Nel Garritsen, 80, Dutch Olympic swimmer (1952).
Óscar González, 23, Mexican super bantamweight and featherweight boxer, brain injury sustained in bout.
Mircea Grosaru, 61, Romanian politician and jurist, MP (since 2000), cardiac arrest.
Max Howell, 86, Australian educator and rugby union player, cancer.
Thomas P. Hughes, 90, American historian of technology.
Alister Leat, 28, New Zealand judoka, suicide.
Gloria Leonard, 73, American pornographic actress and magazine publisher (High Society), complications from a stroke. 
Chiwanki Lyainga, 30, Zambian international footballer, stabbed.
Joan Mondale, 83, American arts advocate, Second Lady of the United States (1977–1981), Alzheimer's disease.
Helmut Niedermeyer, 87, Austrian businessman, heart attack. 
John F. Rockart, 83, American organizational theorist. 
Barry Rubin, 64, American-born Israeli academic and writer, cancer.
Ricardo Sepúlveda, 72, Chilean football player and manager.
Elyakum Shapirra, 87, Israeli conductor and accordionist.
Bill Sinkin, 100, American equality and alternative energy activist.
Pål Skjønberg, 94, Norwegian actor (Hunger).
Hiroyuki Suzuki, 68, Japanese architectural historian, pneumonia.

4
Richard Aldridge, 68, British palaeontologist.
Keith Allen, 90, Canadian ice hockey player and executive (Philadelphia Flyers), dementia.
Baldomero Amarilla, 78, Paraguayan footballer.
Jim B. Baker, 72, American stage, film and television actor.
Eugenio Corti, 93, Italian writer (The Red Horse).
André Delattre, 82, French politician.
Khandaker Rashiduzzaman Dudu, 69, Bangladeshi politician.
Howard Kupperman, 82, American politician, Mayor of Longport (1983–1992).
Pierre Lacaze, 88, French Olympic athlete.
Dennis Lota, 40, Zambian footballer.
Hubert Luthe, 86, German Roman Catholic prelate, Bishop of Essen (1991–2002).
R. Ellen Magenis, 89, American pediatrician and geneticist. 
Ed McKitka, 75, Canadian politician, Mayor of Surrey, British Columbia (1975–1977), traffic collision.
Peter Moreth, 72, German politician.
Anirudh Lal Nagar, 83, Indian econometrician.
Minus Polak, 85, Dutch politician and judge, member of the Senate (1976–1977) and Council of State (1985–1995), heart attack.
Hazel Sampson, 103, American Klallam elder and linguist, last native speaker of the Klallam language.
Ștefan Stoica, 37, Romanian politician, Senator (since 2012), cancer.
Józef Trojak, 47, Polish footballer, heart failure.
David Wasawo, 91, Kenyan zoologist.
Wu Ma, 71, Chinese-born Hong Kong actor and director, lung cancer.
Alfred S. Yue, 95, American engineer and professor emeritus.

5
Joop Ave, 79, Indonesian government official, Minister of Tourism, Post and Telecommunications (1993–1998).
Suzanne Basso, 59, American convicted murderer, execution by lethal injection.
Carlos Borges, 82, Uruguayan footballer.
Robert A. Dahl, 98, American political scientist and professor emeritus (Yale University).
Gary Giles, 74, New Zealand cricketer.
Richard Hayman, 93, American conductor (St. Louis Symphony).
Samantha Juste, 69, British television personality (Top of the Pops), stroke.
Árpád Prandler, 83, Hungarian jurist, judge of the International Criminal Tribunal for the former Yugoslavia (2006–2013).
Mirkka Rekola, 82, Finnish writer.
Juthika Roy, 93, Indian bhajan singer.
Tom Sandberg, 60, Norwegian art photographer.
Edward B. Sell, 71, American taekwondo instructor, leukemia.
Rama Varma Kochaniyan Thampuran, 101, Indian royal (Cochin royal family).
Tzeni Vanou, 74, Greek singer, cancer.

6
Harmodio Arias Cerjack, 57, Panamanian politician, Foreign Minister (2003–2004).
Claire Betz, 93, American baseball team owner (Philadelphia Phillies).
Vasiľ Biľak, 96, Czechoslovak politician, Secretary of the Central Committee of the Communist Party (1968–1988).
Cornelius Botha, 81, South African politician, Administrator of Natal Province (1990–1994), heart failure.
Harry de Jong, 81, Canadian politician.
Tommy Dixon, 84, English footballer (West Ham United).
Lester Goran, 85, American novelist (The Paratrooper of Mechanic Avenue).
Alison Jolly, 76, American primatologist and author.
Ralph Kiner, 91, American Hall of Fame baseball player (Pittsburgh Pirates) and announcer (New York Mets), natural causes.
Maxine Kumin, 88, American poet and author, Pulitzer Prize winner for Poetry (1973).
Bob McQuillen, 90, American contra dance musician. 
Tōru Mori, 78, Japanese baseball player, hepatocellular carcinoma.
Peter Philipp, 42, German writer and comedian.
Marty Plissner, 87, American political commentator (CBS News), coined "too close to call" phrase, lung cancer.
Sandeep Singh, 25, Indian cricketer, tractor accident.
Ingemar Ståhl, 75, Swedish economist.
John Vockler, 89, Australian Anglican prelate, Bishop of Polynesia (1962–1968).
Vaçe Zela, 74, Albanian singer and guitarist, recipient of the Merited Artist of Albania (1973) and the People's Artist of Albania (1977).

7
Ghayyur Akhtar, 68, Pakistani actor.
David Alexander-Sinclair, 86, British Army major general (1st Armoured Division). 
Hans Andresen, 86, Danish Olympic cyclist.
Christopher Barry, 88, British television director (Doctor Who).
Terje Bergstad, 75, Norwegian painter and graphic artist.
Kenneth Francis Brown, 94, American Hawaiian politician.
S. M. H. Burney, 90, Indian civil servant.
Chriselliam, 3, Irish-bred British-trained Thoroughbred racehorse, foot infection.
Claire Duhamel, 88, French actress (Stolen Kisses).
Elmer Edes, 76, American handball player.
Mohamed Guessous, 76, Moroccan sociologist and politician.
Hasjrul Harahap, 82, Indonesian government official, Minister of Forestry (1988–1993).
Daniel J. Harrington, 73, American Jesuit priest, biblical scholar and professor (Boston College), cancer.
Georgina Henry, 53, British journalist, deputy editor of The Guardian (1995–2006), sinus cancer.
Arthur J. Hubbard, Sr., 102, American Navajo Code Talker and politician, Arizona State Senator (1972–1984).
Ernie Lyons, 99, Irish motorcycle racer.
Murray Mendenhall, Jr., 88, American basketball player (Anderson Packers) and coach.
Hylton Mitchell, 87, Trinidad Olympic cyclist.
Doug Mohns, 80, Canadian ice hockey player (Boston Bruins, Chicago Blackhawks), myelodysplastic syndrome.
Bill Ritchie, 86, Canadian politician.
J. Mack Robinson, 90, American businessman and philanthropist.
Tado, 39, Filipino comedian, traffic collision.
Camille Wagner, 88, Luxembourgian footballer.

8
Terry Adkins, 60, American conceptual artist, heart failure. 
Ernst Bakker, 67, Dutch politician, Mayor of Hilversum (1998–2011).
Richard Battin, 88, American electrical engineer (Apollo Guidance Computer).
Dick Berk, 74, American jazz drummer and bandleader.
Els Borst, 81, Dutch politician, Minister of Health, Welfare and Sport (1994–2002), Deputy Prime Minister (1998–2002), Minister of State (since 2012), homicide.
Deogratias Muganwa Byabazaire, 72, Ugandan Roman Catholic prelate, Bishop of Hoima (since 1991).
Michael Denborough, 84, Australian medical researcher, founder of the Nuclear Disarmament Party.
Finbarr Dwyer, 67, Irish accordion player.
Bernard Hedges, 86, Welsh cricketer (Glamorgan).
Nancy Holt, 75, American land artist.
Keith Hughes, 45, American basketball player (Rutgers University).
Abdul Salam Kanaan, 83, Jordanian politician.
Philippe Mahut, 57, French footballer (national team), cancer.
Mike Melluish, 81, English cricket player and administrator, President of the Marylebone Cricket Club (1991–1992).
Andy Paton, 91, Scottish footballer.
Sir Richard Peirse, 82, British air vice marshal.
Maicon Pereira de Oliveira, 25, Brazilian footballer, traffic collision.
John Ikataere Rarikin, 70, Tuvaluan Roman Catholic prelate, Superior of Funafuti (since 2010).
Thee Kian Wie, 78, Indonesian economist (LIPI).
Nishioka Tsuneo, 90, Japanese martial artist.
Abe Woodson, 79, American football player (San Francisco 49ers).

9
Pius Suh Awa, 83, Cameroonian Roman Catholic prelate, Bishop of Buéa (1973–2006).
Gabriel Axel, 95, Danish film director (Babette's Feast) and actor.
Eric Bercovici, 80, American screenwriter and producer (Shōgun), heart attack.
Ranjit Bhatia, 77, Indian Olympic long-distance runner (1960).
Serafin R. Cuevas, 85, Filipino jurist, Secretary of Justice (1998–2000).
Valeria De Franciscis, 98, Italian actress.
William Goodreds, 93, English cricketer.
Jan Groenendijk, 67, Dutch footballer (Utrecht), esophageal cancer.
Joseph Harb, 74, Lebanese writer and poet.
Hal Herring, 89, American football player and coach.
Sir Graham Hills, 87, Scottish chemist.
Eddie Holding, 83, English football player and manager, prostate cancer.
Florentina López de Jesús, 74, Mexican weaver, heart attack.
La Cucaracha, 12, British Thoroughbred racehorse.
Marius, 2, Danish giraffe, considered unsuitable for breeding, shot.
Roland Oliver, 90, British academic and professor emeritus.
Harald Øveraas, 86, Norwegian trade unionist.
Mauro Pane, 50, Italian racing driver and stuntman (Rush), traffic collision.
Antanas Račas, 73, Lithuanian politician.
Logan Scott-Bowden, 93, British military officer, first commander of the Ulster Defence Regiment (1970–1971).
Fazal Shahabuddin, 78, Bangladeshi poet and journalist.
Sverre Solberg, 54, Norwegian actor.
Sir John Stibbon, 79, British military officer, Master-General of the Ordnance (1987–1991).
Roger Tomlinson, 80, British geographer.
AKM Yusuf, 87, Bangladeshi politician.

10
Lochie Jo Allen, 96, American musician, teacher, and writer.
Robert Bell, 87, American politician and lawyer.
Jim Butler, 70, American football player, dementia.
Carlos Capriles Ayala, 90, Venezuelan historian and diplomat.
Len Chalmers, 77, English footballer (Leicester).
Mike Cottell, 82, British civil engineer.
William A. Edelstein, 69, American physicist, lung cancer.
Stuart Hall, 82, Jamaican-born British cultural theorist.
Gordon Harris, 73, English footballer, cancer.
Doug Jarrett, 69, Canadian ice hockey player (Chicago Blackhawks, New York Rangers), cancer.
Betty Jaynes, 68, American Hall of Fame basketball coach (James Madison University).
Olga Jevrić, 91, Serbian sculptor.
Alan R. Katritzky, 85, British chemist.
Nenad Lukić, 45, Serbian footballer (Obilić).
Ronnie Masterson, 87, Irish actress (Angela's Ashes).
Ian McNaught-Davis, 84, British television presenter and mountaineer, President of the UIAA (1995–2004).
Albin W. Norblad, 74, American attorney and jurist, Oregon Circuit Court Judge (since 1973), brain hemorrhage.
Christian Patria, 69, French politician, MP (2002–2005, 2007–2010).
Tomaž Pengov, 64, Slovenian singer-songwriter, guitarist, lutist and poet.
Bolesław Polnar, 61, Polish artist.
Boris Romanov, 76–77, Soviet Olympic cyclist.
Shirley Temple, 85, American actress (Heidi) and diplomat, Ambassador to Ghana (1974–1976); Czechoslovakia (1989–1992), COPD.
Pere Tena Garriga, 85, Spanish Roman Catholic prelate, Auxiliary Bishop of Barcelona (1993–2004).
Hōzan Yamamoto, 76, Japanese musician.

11
Roy Alvarez, 63, Filipino actor, cardiac arrest.
Aslan, 83, French artist.
Alice Babs, 90, Swedish singer and actress, Alzheimer's disease.
Tito Canepa, 97, Dominican painter.
Peter Desbarats, 80, Canadian author, playwright and journalist (The Globe and Mail).
Elisabeth Djurle, 83, Swedish priest.
John Fichter, 79, American politician, member of the Pennsylvania House of Representatives (1993–2006).
Lewis Gunn, 95, Canadian cricketer.
Fernando González Pacheco, 81, Colombian television personality.
Léon Hégélé, 89, French Roman Catholic prelate, Auxiliary Bishop of Strasbourg (1985–2000).
*Gregorio Jiménez de la Cruz, 42, Mexican journalist and photographer, murdered. (death announced on this date)
Max McLeary, 66, American minor league baseball umpire, cancer.
Amadou Meïté, 64, Ivorian Olympic sprinter (1972, 1976).
Seán Potts, 83, Irish musician (The Chieftains).
Stan Rickaby, 89, English footballer (West Bromwich Albion).
Skënder Sallaku, 79, Albanian comic and actor. 
Kayman Sankar, 87, Guyanese rice farmer and politician.
Rolf Clemens Wagner, 69, German terrorist (Red Army Faction).
Emory Williams, 102, American businessman.

12
David Agiashvili, 64, Georgian film director and screenwriter.
Robert H. Babcock, 88, American historian.
Stewart W. Bainum Sr., 94, American businessman and philanthropist.
Luigi Balzarini, 78, Italian footballer.
Alberto Benavides de la Quintana, 93, Peruvian businessman and engineer.
Thomas Borcherding, 74, American economist.
Sid Caesar, 91, American comedian and actor (Your Show of Shows, Grease, It's a Mad, Mad, Mad, Mad World), Emmy winner (1952, 1957).
Aldo Colombini, 63, Italian magician.
Bassil Da Costa, 23, Venezuelan university student, shot.
Sir Diarmuid Downs, 91, British automotive engineer (Ricardo).
Maggie Estep, 50, American poet and writer (Love is a Dog From Hell), heart attack.
Santiago Feliú, 51, Cuban singer-songwriter, heart attack.
Jean-Louis Giasson, 74, Canadian-born Honduran Roman Catholic prelate, Bishop of Yoro (2005–2014).
Masayuki Ishii, 84, Japanese Olympic sailor.
Theodor Kleine, 89, German Olympic canoer (1956).
John Pickstone, 69, British science historian.
John Poppitt, 91, British footballer.
Josef Röhrig, 88, German footballer (Köln).
William Zeckendorf, Jr., 84, American real estate developer.

13
Gordon Bell, 79, British cartoonist (The Dandy). 
Lorna Casselton, 75, British biologist.
Tommy Cooke, 99, Irish hurler (Limerick).
Piero D'Inzeo, 90, Italian Olympic show jumper (1956, 1960, 1964, 1972), European champion (1959).
Drew Denson, 48, American baseball player (Atlanta Braves, Chicago White Sox), complications from amyloidosis.
King Kester Emeneya, 57, Congolese singer, heart failure.
Horst Eylmann, 80, German politician.
Charles J. Fillmore, 84, American linguist.
Rose Finn-Kelcey, 68, British artist, motor neurone disease.
Seyed Kazem Ghiyassian, 74,  Iranian footballer (Aboumoslem, Payam Mashhad).
Raymond Heimbecker, 91, Canadian cardiovascular surgeon. 
Jimmy Jones, 85, Northern Irish footballer.
Ken Jones, 83, British actor (Porridge, The Squirrels), bowel cancer.
Balu Mahendra, 74, Indian National Film Award-winning filmmaker, cinematographer, screenwriter and editor (Kokila, Moondram Pirai), heart attack.
Georgy Martyniuk, 73, Russian actor, People's Artist of Russia (2003).
Ernest Mead, 95, American academic (University of Virginia).
John Mortimore, 80, English cricketer.
Louis Nganga a Ndzando, 90–91, Congolese Roman Catholic prelate, Bishop of Lisala (1964–1997).
Richard Møller Nielsen, 76, Danish football player and manager, brain tumour.
Zbigniew Romaszewski, 74, Polish politician, Senator (1989–2011).
Ghulam Mohammad Saznawaz, 74, Indian Sufi musician.
René Teulade, 82, French politician, Social Affairs Minister (1992–1993), Senator (since 2008).
Marty Thau, 75, American rock and roll entrepreneur and music producer, renal failure.
Michael J. Wagner, 72, American politician, member of the Maryland House of Delegates (1974–1977) and Senate (1978–1994), cancer.
Ralph Waite, 85, American actor (The Waltons, Roots, NCIS).
Ken'ichi Yamamoto, 57, Japanese novelist, winner of the Naoki Prize (2009), lung cancer.
Uanhenga Xitu, 89, Angolan writer and politician.

14
George Anastaplo, 88, American law professor (Loyola University Chicago School of Law), prostate cancer. 
Francisco José Arnáiz Zarandona, 88, Spanish-born Dominican Roman Catholic prelate, Auxiliary Bishop of Santo Domingo (1988–2002). 
 Khodeza Azam, 76, Bangladeshi civil servant.
Durdy Bayramov, 75, Russian-Turkmen painter, liver cancer.
 Marshall Browne, 78, Australian banking executive and crime novelist, cancer.
James Cahill, 87, American art historian, authority on Chinese art, prostate cancer.
Pete Camarata, 67, American labor activist.
Remo Capitani, 86, Italian actor (They Call Me Trinity).
James Condon, 90, Australian actor (Neighbours, Prisoner).
José Darcourt, 55, Cuban baseball player, colon cancer.
William Davila, 82, American soldier and businessman, Alzheimer's disease.
William Duff, 91, Scottish banker and Arabist.
Sir Thomas Finney, 91, English footballer (Preston North End).
Jim Fregosi, 71, American baseball player (California Angels) and manager (Philadelphia Phillies), complications from a stroke.
Robert M. Fresco, 83, American documentary filmmaker (Czechoslovakia 1968).
Martha Goldstein, 94, American harpsichordist.
Sally Gross, 60, South African anti-apartheid and intersex activist. 
John Henson, 48, American puppeteer (The Muppets), heart attack.
Ferry Hoogendijk, 80, Dutch journalist (Elsevier) and politician, member of the House of Representatives (2002–2003).
Chad Kellogg, 42, American mountaineer, rock fall. 
Chris Pearson, 82, Canadian politician, Premier of Yukon (1978–1985).
Benny Reynolds, 77, American rodeo performer, PRCA All-Around Cowboy Champion (1961), heart attack.
Patrick Scott, 93, Irish artist.
Mike Stepovich, 94, American politician, Governor of the Territory of Alaska (1957–1958), head injury following a fall.
Edward J. Walsh, 71, American journalist (The Washington Post), lung cancer. 
John Wilson, 2nd Baron Moran, 89, British diplomat and peer. 
Clifford Wright, 91, British Anglican prelate, Bishop of Monmouth (1986–1991).

15
Corrado Benedetti, 57, Italian footballer. 
Herbert Blöcker, 71, German Olympic equestrian (1992), cancer.
Cliff Bole, 76, American television director (MacGyver, T.J. Hooker, Star Trek: The Next Generation).
Federico Campbell, 72, Mexican writer, stroke following influenza.
Mary Grace Canfield, 89, American actress (Green Acres, Bewitched, General Hospital), lung cancer.
Jamie Coots, 41, American pastor, snake handler and reality television cast member, snakebite.
Robert Descharnes, 88, French photographer and filmmaker, collaborator with Salvador Dalí.
Thelma Estrin, 89, American computer scientist.
Jean-Marie Géhu, 83, French botanist. 
Hans Gericke, 101, German architect and urban planner.
Charles Hammock, 72, American politician, member of the Pennsylvania House of Representatives (1973–1976).
Angelo Henderson, 51, American journalist (The Wall Street Journal) and radio personality (WCHB), Pulitzer Prize winner for Feature Writing (1999), coronary embolism.
Jim Lacy, 87, American basketball player (Loyola University), melanoma. 
Christopher Malcolm, 67, Scottish actor (The Empire Strikes Back, Highlander, Absolutely Fabulous), cancer.
Roy Oxlade, 85, British painter.
Rajendran Raja, 65, Indian-born American physicist, brain cancer.
Antonio Ravelo, 73, Venezuelan footballer.
Horst Rechelbacher, 72, Austrian-born American business executive, founder of Aveda, pancreatic cancer.
Oliver Reynolds, 92, South African cricketer.
Raghunath Seth, 83, Indian flautist and composer.
Enyu Valchev, 78, Bulgarian Olympic medalist freestyle wrestler (1960, 1964, 1968).
Dénes Zsigmondy, 91, Hungarian classical violinist and music educator.

16
Angela Baca, 86, American artist.
Sherwood Berg, 94, American educator and college administrator.
Ron Casey, 61, American politician, member of the Missouri House of Representatives (2004–2012), complications from a fall.
George Coates, 90, Australian football player (Fitzroy).
Robert J. Conley, 73, American Cherokee author. 
Dimitar Drazhev, 89, Bulgarian alpine skier (1948 and 1952 Winter Olympics).
Frank Espada, 83, American photojournalist.
Eisenhower Tree, 125, American loblolly pine (Augusta National Golf Club), damage from ice storm. (death announced on this date)
Ken Farragut, 85, American football player (Philadelphia Eagles), complications from diabetes.
Raymond Louis Kennedy, 67, American singer-songwriter, musician and producer.
Charlie Kraak, 81, American basketball player (Indiana University).
Kralle Krawinkel, 66, German musician (Trio), lung cancer.
Jaroslav Krejčí, 98, Czech sociologist, academic and historian.
Emmet G. Lavery, Jr., 86, American television executive and producer, natural causes.
Parasram Maderna, 87, Indian politician, Rajasthan MLA for Jodhpur (1957–2003), respiratory failure.
Jimmy T. Murakami, 80, American animator and film director (When the Wind Blows).
Mbulelo Mzamane, 65, South African writer and academic.
Jay S. Rosenblatt, 90, American psychoanalyst.
Matti Ruohola, 73, Finnish comic actor.
Israel Scheffler, 90, American philosopher.
Michael Shea, 67, American science fiction author (Polyphemus).

17
Amarkant, 88, Indian writer.
Reza Barati, 23, Iranian architect and asylum-seeker, murdered.
Rollie Beale, 84, American racecar driver.
Breck Bednar, 14, English student, stabbed.
Joe Bell, 90, Canadian ice hockey player (New York Rangers). 
Howard Brenner, 84, American chemical engineer.
Richard N. Cabela, 77, American businessman, co-founder of Cabela's.
Bob Casale, 61, American guitarist (Devo) and film score engineer (Happy Gilmore, Rugrats), heart failure.
Makar Dhwaja Darogha, 81, Indian classical dancer.
Frank Farmer, 89, American writer and author.
Peter Florin, 92, German politician and diplomat, President of the United Nations General Assembly (1987, 1988).
Ahmed Mirza Jamil, 92, Pakistani calligrapher.
Ian Kagedan, 58, Canadian public servant. 
Per Källberg, 66, Swedish cinematographer.
Frankie Kao, 63, Taiwanese singer, leukemia.
James McNaughton, 51, Irish hurler (Antrim).
Tibor Perecsi, 72, Hungarian footballer.
Dick Reynolds, 86, American politician, member of the Texas House of Representatives (1973–1977).
Don Safran, 84, American screenwriter (Happy Days) and producer, heart failure.
Wolfgang Schulhoff, 74, German politician.
Kokichi Shimoinaba, 87, Japanese politician and police chief, Minister of Justice (1997–1998), sepsis.
Wayne Smith, 48, Jamaican reggae musician ("Sleng Teng").
R. K. Srikantan, 94, Indian Carnatic singer.
Frank Wappat, 84, English radio personality (BBC Newcastle), heart failure.
Arthur M. Wolfe, 74, American astrophysicist, cancer.
Hanns Egon Wörlen, 98, German architect.

18
Forman S. Acton, 93, American computer scientist.
Isaiah Balat, 61, Nigerian politician, Senator for Kaduna South (2003–2007).
Gordon Bowra, 77, British surgeon (British Antarctic Survey).
Valeriy Brezdenyuk, 50, Ukrainian painter, shot.
Yudhistir Das, 90, Indian politician, Odisha MLA for Kissan Nagar (1990–2000), Speaker of the Legislative Assembly (1990–1995).
Peter Davies, 88, Welsh rugby player.
Antonina Dvoryanets, 61, Ukrainian engineer and political activist.
Ounsi el-Hajj, 77, Lebanese poet.
Mavis Gallant, 91, Canadian writer, Companion of the Order of Canada (1993).
Kristof Goddaert, 27, Belgian professional cyclist, traffic collision.
Al Greene, 59, American baseball player (Detroit Tigers).
Cob Jarvis, 81, American college basketball player and head coach (University of Mississippi).
Gregory Kane, 62, American newspaper columnist (Baltimore Sun), cancer.
Buddy Leake, 80, American CFL football player (Winnipeg Blue Bombers).
George Lenne, 97, Australian football player (Melbourne).
Herbie Martin, 86, Irish cricketer.
Bernd Noske, 67, German musician (Birth Control).
Michael Peterson, 72, American politician, member of the Kansas House of Representatives (1979–1990, since 2005). 
Arthur Rowley, 80, English footballer (Liverpool).
Nikhil Baran Sengupta, 70, Indian art director, production designer and actor.
Margarita Stāraste-Bordevīka, 100, Russian-born Latvian author of children's books.
Andrea Joyce Stone, 65, American Mayanist. 
Malcolm Tierney, 75, British actor (Doctor Who, Star Wars, Braveheart), pulmonary fibrosis.
Joy Todd, American casting director (Prince of the City, Moscow on the Hudson, Gettysburg), natural causes.
Robbie van Graan, 74, South African cricketer.
Viscera, 43, American professional wrestler (WWE), heart attack.
Maria Franziska von Trapp, 99, Austrian-born American singer, portrayed in The Sound of Music.

19
Antonio Benítez, 62, Spanish footballer (Real Betis), complications from bladder cancer.
Norbert Beuls, 57, Belgian footballer.
Kresten Bjerre, 67, Danish footballer (Molenbeek), cancer. 
Szilárd Borbély, 51, Hungarian academic, writer and poet.
Génesis Carmona, 22, Venezuelan pageant winner, shot.
Jean Charbonnel, 86, French politician.
Mick Cook, 76, Australian footballer.
Toshiko D'Elia, 84, Japanese-born American long-distance runner, brain cancer.
Simón Díaz, 85, Venezuelan singer and composer.
David W. Doyle, 89, British-born American author.
Dale Gardner, 65, American astronaut (STS-8, STS-51-A), brain aneurysm.
John Henderson, 84, British footballer (Workington Town).
Ced Hovey, 95, Australian footballer (Geelong).
Valeri Kubasov, 79, Russian cosmonaut (Soyuz 6, Apollo-Soyuz Test Project/Soyuz 19, Soyuz 36).
Josefina Napravilová, 100, Czech social worker.
Duffy Power, 72, English blues and rock and roll singer.
P. R. Rajan, 75, Indian politician.
Ivor Robinson, 89, British bookbinder and craftsman.
Bernie Shannon, 85, Australian football player (Collingwood).
Miroslav Štandera, 95, Czech World War II fighter pilot (Royal Air Force, French Air Force), recipient of the Order of Tomáš Garrigue Masaryk.
Toni Ucci, 92, Italian actor and comedian.
Blanca Vela, 78, American politician, first female mayor of Brownsville, Texas (1999–2003).
Jim Weirich, 57, American computer scientist, developer of Rake.

20
Royce Abbey, 91, Australian businessperson.
Anthony Clifford Allison, 88, South African geneticist.
Rafael Addiego Bruno, 90, Uruguayan jurist and politician, Constitutional President (1985).
Walter D. Ehlers, 92, American World War II soldier, recipient of the Medal of Honor (1944).
Sir Samuel Falle, 95, British diplomat.
Antoinette Fouque, 77, French feminist psychoanalyst.
Roger Hill, 65, American actor (The Warriors, One Life to Live), heart attack.
Ustym Holodnyuk, 19, Ukrainian activist and Euromaidan, shot.
Tea Ista, 81, Finnish actress.
Ihor Kostenko, 22, Ukrainian journalist and student, shot.
Parvathi Krishnan, 94, Indian politician, MP for Coimbatore (1957–1962, 1974–1980).
Reghu Kumar, 60, Indian composer, complications from kidney treatment.
Lu Xuechang, 49, Chinese film director, natural causes.
Sir Ian McKay, 84, New Zealand judge and lawyer, Judge of the Court of Appeal (1991–1997).
Cuthbert A. Pattillo, 89, American Air Force military officer. 
Jorge Polaco, 67, Argentine filmmaker (En el nombre del hijo, Kindergarten, Siempre es difícil volver a casa), cardiac arrest.
Peter A. Rona, 79, American oceanographer and professor (Rutgers University), multiple myeloma.
Roy Simmons, 57, American football player (New York Giants), complications from pneumonia.
Garrick Utley, 74, American television journalist (NBC News), prostate cancer.
Anthony Whitaker, 69, New Zealand herpetologist, heart attack.

21
Alphonse Arzel, 86, French politician, Senator for Finistère (1980–1998).
Paul Bitz, 90, American politician, Indiana State Senator (1954–1962).
Sakis Boulas, 59, Greek singer-songwriter and actor, cancer.
Veselin Branev, 81, Bulgarian film director, screenwriter, film critic and writer.
Stanley Brotman, 89, American senior judge, District Court Judge for New Jersey (1975–2013) and the Virgin Islands (1989–1992).
Donald F. Brown, 105, American archaeologist.
Bootsie Calhoun, 90, American politician, member of the Georgia House of Representatives (1975–1977).
Francesco Di Giacomo, 66, Italian singer (Banco del Mutuo Soccorso).
Gene Carmichael, 86, American politician, South Carolina State Senator (1981–1993).
Elaine Cassidy, 83, Australian politician.
Rune Flodman, 87, Swedish Olympic shooter.
Héctor Maestri, 78, Cuban baseball player (Washington Senators).
Beatrix Miller, 89, British magazine editor (Vogue).
George Modelski, 88, American political scientist.
Roland Nilsson, 89, Swedish Olympic athlete (1948).
Eddie O'Brien, 83, American baseball player (Pittsburgh Pirates).
Elaine O'Brien, 58, American politician, member of the Connecticut House of Representatives (since 2010), glioblastoma.
Georgette Rejewski, 104, Belgian-born Dutch actress.
Matthew Robinson, 28, Australian Paralympic snowboarder, skiing accident.
Đoko Rosić, 81, Serbian-born Bulgarian actor.
Cornelius Schnauber, 74, German-born American academic, complications from a heart attack.
Bob Sharpe, 88, British footballer (Darlington).
John Strawson, 93, British Army officer.

22
Maurice Bessinger, 84, American restaurateur.
William Chambliss, 80, American criminologist and sociologist.
Arduíno Colassanti, 78, Italian-born Brazilian actor.
Zsuzsa Csala, 80, Hungarian actress.
Richard Daugherty, 91, American archaeologist, led excavation of Ozette Indian Village, bone cancer.
Charlotte Dawson, 47, New Zealand-born Australian television personality, suicide by hanging.
Karuna Dharma, 73, American Buddhist scholar and nun, Alzheimer's disease.
Abdul-Karim Gharaybeh, 91, Jordanian historian, academic and politician, member of the Senate (2005–2007).
Sir Richard Ground, 63, English judge and jurist, Chief Justice of the Turks and Caicos Islands (1998–2004) and Bermuda (2004–2012).
Grigor Gurzadyan, 91, Armenian astronomer.
Edith Kramer, 98, Austrian artist.
Giancarlo Livraghi, 86, Italian author.
Ivan Nagy, 70, Hungarian ballet dancer.
Sigbert Prais, 85, German-born British economist.
Liudmyla Sheremet, 71, Ukrainian anaesthesiologist and activist.
Fred Sunnen, 74, Luxembourgian politician.
Trebor Jay Tichenor, 74, American ragtime pianist and composer.
Leo Vroman, 98, Dutch-American hematologist, poet and illustrator.
Robert C. Wright, 69, American politician, member of the Pennsylvania House of Representatives (1981–1992), complications from Lyme disease and ALS.

23
Carla Accardi, 89, Italian painter.
Ezio Bertuzzo, 61, Italian footballer.
Keith Bridges, 84, British rugby league player.
Charles Capps, 80, American Christian preacher. 
John Christoforou, 92, British painter.
K. Alison Clarke-Stewart, 70, Canadian developmental psychologist.
G. Bhuvaraghan, 86, Indian politician, MP for Cuddalore (1977–1980), Tamil Nadu MLA for Vridhachalam (1962–1971, 1989–1991).
Ely Capacio, 58, Filipino basketball player, coach and executive, Board Governor of the Petron Blaze Boosters (since 2012), ruptured aneurysm.
Chip Damiani, 68, American drummer (The Remains), massive brain hemorrhage.
Penny DeHaven, 65, American country singer, cancer.
John Grant, 83, Scottish children's author.
Thomas M. Herbert, 86, American politician and judge (Supreme Court of Ohio).
Alice Herz-Sommer, 110, Czech-British supercentenarian, world's oldest Holocaust survivor, subject of The Lady in Number 6.
Roger Hilsman, 94, American government official, political scientist and author, Director of the Bureau of Intelligence and Research (1961–1963).
John Koerner, 100, Czech-born Canadian artist.
Hansi Knoteck, 99, German actress.
Mike Parker, 84, British-born American typographer and software executive, helped popularize use of Helvetica.
Paul Pawlak, Sr., 96, American politician, member of the Connecticut House of Representatives (1961–1969, 1975–1979).
Charlie Porter, 63, American mountaineer and climate change scientist, heart attack.
Piyush Sadhu, 36, Indian cricketer.
József Sátori, 87, Hungarian Olympic rower.
Samuel Sheinbein, 34, American-Israeli convicted murderer, shot.
William F. Thomas, 89, American newspaper editor (Los Angeles Times), oversaw 11 Pulitzer Prizes, natural causes.
Eugene M. Wescott, 82, American scientist, artist, and traditional dancer.
Norman Whiting, 93, English cricketer (Worcestershire).

24
Samuel Adesina, 56, Nigerian politician, Speaker of the Ondo State House of Assembly, bladder cancer.
Chalmers Archer, 85, American author and professor.
Ralph Bahna, 71, American business executive, CEO of Cunard Line (1980–1989), Chairman of Priceline.com (2004–2013).
Franny Beecher, 92, American Hall of Fame guitarist (Bill Haley & His Comets).
Michel Bensch, 89, Belgian footballer
Wiel Bremen, 88, Dutch politician, member of the House of Representatives (1971–1981).
Naresh Chandra Chaki, 79, Indian politician, cancer.
Ted Connolly, 82, American football player (San Francisco 49ers), acute myelocytic leukemia.
Richard O. Culver Jr., 77, Americane Marine officer.
Eilert Eilertsen, 95, Norwegian politician and footballer.
Lamar Davis, 92, American football player.
Jerry Denbo, 63, American politician, member of the Indiana House of Representatives (1990–2007).
Neil Harrison, 64, Canadian Hall of Fame curler, world champion (1983, 1990), cancer.
Nicolae Herlea, 86, Romanian operatic baritone, recipient of the Order of the Star of Romania (2007). 
Valerie V. Hunt, 97, American scientist.
Alexis Hunter, 65, New Zealand-born British painter and photographer, motor neurone disease.
Vasile Huțanu, 59, Romanian Olympic ice hockey player (1976).
Hamid Nawaz Khan, Pakistani military officer, Defence Secretary (2001–2005), Interior Minister (2007–2008).
Prokash Karmakar, 81, Indian painter.
Christopher Luxmoore, 87, British Anglican prelate, Bishop of Bermuda (1984–1989).
Carlos Páez Vilaró, 90, Uruguayan artist.
Juan José Plans, 70, Spanish writer.
Harold Ramis, 69, American writer, director and actor (Groundhog Day, Vacation, Ghostbusters), vasculitis.
Günter Reisch, 86, German film director.
Anna Reynolds, 82, English opera singer.
Alex Russell, 91, Northern Irish footballer.
Bhob Stewart, 76, American cartoonist and writer.

25
Angèle Arsenault, 70, Canadian singer-songwriter, cancer.
Juanita Bartlett, 86, American television producer (The Rockford Files, Scarecrow and Mrs. King). 
Pim Bekkering, 82, Dutch footballer.
Wilfried Brauer, 76, German computer scientist.
Jürgen Brümmer, 49, German Olympic gymnast (1988), suicide by jumping.
Peter Callander, 74, British songwriter and record producer, heart attack. 
Orlando Castro Llanes, 88, Venezuelan banker.
Antonio Cermeño, 44, Venezuelan boxer, two-time world champion, shot.
Mário Coluna, 78, Portuguese footballer, pulmonary infection.
Ian Cuttler, 43, Mexican photographer and art director, traffic collision.
Quentin Elias, 39, French actor, model and singer (Alliage), heart attack. 
Carlos Gracida, 53, Mexican polo player, brain injury from competition fall.
George Guerieri, 86, American politician, Mississippi State Senator (1980–1992).
Edward A. Irving, 86, Canadian geologist.
Jim Lange, 81, American game show host and disc jockey (The Dating Game, Name That Tune), heart attack.
Paco de Lucía, 66, Spanish flamenco guitarist, heart attack.
Chokwe Lumumba, 66, American politician and lawyer, Mayor of Jackson, Mississippi (since 2013).
Tom Margerison, 90, British science journalist and broadcaster, founder of New Scientist.
David McKinney, 68, New Zealand author and journalist.
Gordon Nutt, 81, English footballer (Coventry City).
Anthony Shacklady, 68, British Olympic wrestler.
Emil Simon, 77, Romanian conductor and composer, cancer.
Philip Smart, 53, Jamaican record producer, pancreatic cancer.
Rick Smoliak, 70, American college baseball head coach (Stony Brook University, Northwood University).
Lydia Stevens, 95, American politician, member of the Connecticut House of Representatives (1989–1993), pneumonia.
Martin E. Sullivan, 70, American museum director (National Portrait Gallery, Heard Museum), renal failure.
Dennis Turner, Baron Bilston, 71, British politician, MP for Wolverhampton South East (1987–2005).

26
K. S. Balachandran, 69, Sri Lankan actor.
Al Berard, 53–54, American Cajun musician, aneurysm.
Gian Luigi Berti, 83, Sammarinese politician.
Richard W. Boone, 86, American philanthropist.
Roger Booth, 80, English actor (Barry Lyndon, The Tomorrow People, Cutthroat Island).
Chua Sian Chin, 80, Singaporean politician, Health Minister (1968–1974), heart failure.
Howard Erskine-Hill, 77, English scholar.
Sorel Etrog, 80, Canadian sculptor, recipient of the Order of Canada (1994).
Wayne Frye, 83, American Olympic champion rower (1952).
Georges Hamel, 66, Canadian country music singer-songwriter.
Phyllis Krasilovsky, 87, American children's author, stroke.
Dezső Novák, 75, Hungarian Olympic champion football player (1964, 1968) and coach.
Frank Reed, 59, American soul singer (The Chi-Lites).
Bill Roetzheim, 85. American Olympic gymnast.
Frankie Sardo, 77, American rock and roll musician, cancer.
Michael Taylor, 47, American convicted murderer, execution by lethal injection.
Tim Wilson, 52, American stand-up comedian and country music singer, heart attack.
Irv Wisniewski, 89, American football and basketball player and coach.

27
Aaron Allston, 53, American game designer (Dungeons & Dragons) and sci-fi author (X-Wing), heart failure.
Maurice Benitez, 86, American bishop.
Raymond James Boland, 82, Irish-born American Roman Catholic prelate, Bishop of Birmingham (1988–1993) and Kansas City-St Joseph (1993–2005), lung cancer. 
Bryan Clarke, 81, British geneticist.
Luis Díaz, 42, Cuban baseball player, myocardial infarction.
Max Gors, 67, American judge, member of the South Dakota Supreme Court (2001–2002).
Jan Hoet, 77, Belgian art critic and curator, heart attack.
Tim Kehoe, 43, American author and toy inventor.
Assad Kotaite, 89, Lebanese administrator, Secretary-General and Council President of the International Civil Aviation Organization (1976–2006).
Eric Lockwood, 81, English rugby league player (Wakefield Trinity).
Huber Matos, 95, Cuban dissident, activist and writer, heart attack.
Arnstein Øverkil, 76, Norwegian police chief and jurist.  
Terry Rand, 79, American basketball player (Marquette Warriors), second round NBA draft pick (1956), heart attack.
Richard Sacher, 71, Czech politician, Czechoslovak Interior Minister (1989–1990), member of the Federal Assembly (1990–1992).
Wilford Scypion, 55, American boxer, Golden Gloves National Middleweight Champion (1978), complications from pneumonia.
Chuner Taksami, 83, Russian ethnographer.
Vicente T. Ximenes, 94, American civil rights activist.

28
Nadeem al-Zaro, 82, Jordanian politician, Minister of Transport and Minister of Interior, Mayor of Ramallah.
Guy Alexandre, 68, Haitian diplomat, Ambassador to the Dominican Republic (1995–2003), heart attack.
Matthías Bjarnason, 92, Icelandic politician. 
Juul Bjerke, 85, Norwegian economist.
Yvonne Busch, 84, American jazz musician.
Kevon Carter, 30, Trinidadian footballer, heart attack.
Hugo Brandt Corstius, 78, Dutch author.
Ophelia DeVore, 91, American businesswoman and model.
Ruth Frith, 104, Australian masters athlete.
Benjamín Galván Gómez, 41, Mexican politician and newspaper publisher, homicide.
Robert Holliday, 81, American politician, member of the West Virginia House of Delegates (1962–1968) and Senate (1969–1972, 1981–1994).
David Holmes, 87, British journalist and broadcaster, BBC News Political Editor (1975–1980).
Jerzy Kolendo, 80, Polish historian and archaeologist. 
Lee Lorch, 98, American desegregation activist.
Michio Mado, 104, Japanese poet.
Ana María Moix, 66, Spanish writer, cancer.
Donald Murdoch, 90, New Zealand cricketer.
Karl Anton Rickenbacher, 73, Swiss conductor, heart attack.
C. R. Simha, 71, Indian actor and director, prostate cancer.
Gib Singleton, 78, American sculptor.
James Tague, 77, American writer, key witness to the assassination of John F. Kennedy.
Randy Trautman, 53, American football player (Washington Redskins, Calgary Stampeders).
Norman Yonemoto, 67, American video and visualization artist, stroke.

References

2014-02
 02